Red Hot + Indigo is the 13th entry from the Red Hot AIDS benefit series of compilation albums produced by Paul Heck. It marks the tenth anniversary of the Red Hot Organization (RHO), an international organization which uses mass media as a fundraising tool for its efforts at increasing public AIDS awareness.

As with a trio of earlier entries from the series (Red Hot + Blue, Red Hot + Rio and Red Hot + Rhapsody), Red Hot + Indigo is a tribute to the legacy of one of the greatest composers of the twentieth century, Duke Ellington.

It also marked the return to the creation of music-themed releases, following the detour release of 1999's spoken word album, Optic Nerve, the tribute to artist-activist David Wojnarowicz. (Because of the focus of this release, it is not considered part of the series.)

Fanfare
In conjunction with the release of Indigo, Amazon.com hosted an RHO Benefit Auction, which ran from February 28 to April 11, 2001. The event featured rare RHO memorabilia and the work of Rolling Stone photographer Mark Seliger. Items auctioned at the event include signed proofs of Seliger's work, along with fifty autographed copies of his book and exhibition entitled "Physiognomy: The Mark Seliger Photographs." The books were created exclusively for the RHO, and each contained a unique set of celebrity signatures.

Several celebrities announced to attend the event included the following artists:
 Drew Barrymore
 Beastie Boys
 Jerry Seinfeld
 Ashley Judd
 Marilyn Manson
 Rob Zombie
 Me'Shell N'degeOcello
 Charlize Theron
 Richard Ashcroft
 Courtney Love
 Billy Bob Thornton
 David Byrne
 Lenny Kravitz

Track listing
"Acht O'Clock Rock", performed by Medeski, Martin & Wood – 3:21
"Money Jungle", performed by Black Star + Ron Carter + John Patton – 5:55
"Do Nothin' Till You Hear From Me", performed by Mary J. Blige – 5:01
"Mood Indigo", performed by Melky Sedeck + Joan Armatrading – 4:32
"Come Sunday", performed by Les Nubians – 4:44
"Creole Love Call", performed by Medeski, Martin & Wood + Art Baron – 1:29
"Star Crossed Lovers", performed by Propellerheads + Martha Wainwright – 4:07
"Caravan", performed by The Roots (featuring D'Angelo on keyboards) – 6:06
"C Jam Blues", performed by Kenny Burrell (with Medeski, Martin & Wood) – 3:42
"Bli Blip", performed by Don Byron (with Dean Bowman) – 3:43
"Mount Harissa" (Interlude), performed by Medeski, Martin & Wood – 0:53
"Sophisticated Lady", performed by Amel Larrieux + Clark Terry – 3:55
"In a Sentimental Mood", performed by Kenny Burrell (with Medeski, Martin & Wood) – 4:08
"Satin Doll", performed by Terry Callier – 4:49
"Haunted Nights" (Interlude), performed by Medeski, Martin & Wood + Steve Bernstein – 0:43
"Blue Pepper Dub", performed by Medeski, Martin & Wood – 3:01
"Didjeridoo", performed by Tortoise – 4:38

External links
Roots, Blige, MMW Highlight 'Red Hot' Ellington Tribute News story from VH1.com
Press release Announcing the decision of Amazon.com to begin support for the RHO project.
Amazon.com Special Features: Red Hot Organization Dedicated portal for the series at Amazon.com (provides access to approximately forty (40) free, full-length, MP3 downloads of songs from the series, and other unreleased tracks from the project.)

Red Hot Organization albums
Jazz compilation albums
Duke Ellington tribute albums
2001 compilation albums